The men's sanda 65 kilograms competition at the 2018 Asian Games in Jakarta, Indonesia was held from 20 August to 23 August at the JIExpo Kemayoran Hall B3.

A total of fourteen competitors from fourteen different countries competed in this event, limited to fighters whose body weight was less than 65 kilograms.

Li Mengfan from China won the gold medal after beating Faroud Zafari of Iran in gold medal bout 2–0, Li won both rounds by the same score of 5–0

The bronze medal was shared by Narender Grewal from India and Khalid Hotak of Afghanistan. Hoàng Văn Cao from Vietnam, Akmal Rakhimov from Uzbekistan, Damxoumphone Khieosavath from Laos and Park Seung-mo from South Korea shared the fifth place. Athletes from Indonesia, Kyrgyzstan, Philippines, Pakistan, Nepal and Thailand lost in the first round and didn't advance.

Schedule
All times are Western Indonesia Time (UTC+07:00)

Results
Legend
WO — Won by walkover

References

External links
Official website

Men's sanda 65 kg